Velammal Institute of Technology, is a private institution located in Chennai, India. Established in 2008.

History

Departments 

Under Graduate Courses
 Computer Science & Engineering
 Electrical and Electronics Engineering
 Electronics and Communication Engineering
 Mechanical Engineering
 Information Technology

External links 

 Velammal Institute of Technology

Engineering colleges in Chennai